The Flicker World Tour was the first concert tour by Irish singer Niall Horan, in support of his debut album Flicker (2017). The tour began on 10 March 2018 in Killarney, County Kerry. The tour then visited Oceania, Asia, Latin America, and North America where it concluded on 23 September 2018 in West Palm Beach, Florida.

Background 
On 7 September 2017, Horan officially announced via his Instagram and Twitter accounts that the first dates of the Flicker World Tour would be in Australia and New Zealand. Music Feeds reported: "Horan’s debut arena tour will hit Australia in June, and will see the singer-songwriter play tracks like "This Town" and "Slow Hands", as well as songs from his upcoming debut album. The tour will be supported by American singer-songwriter Maren Morris."

Dates for US and Canada were announced on 15 September 2017, along with the news that Maren Morris would be joining him as the opening act. The tour announcement followed the reveal of the cover of his debut album Flicker (2017) and its release date, 20 October 2017. Tickets for the North American shows went on sale on 22 September 2017. Horan added Latin American tour dates to the Flicker World Tour on 2 October 2017.

The European dates of the tour were announced on 6 October 2017 and Julia Michaels was announced as the opening act for that leg of the tour. The Belfast Telegraph reported: "Niall will kick off his 2018 tour at the 3Arena in Dublin on March 12. His other European dates include London, Manchester, Berlin and Amsterdam." Horan later added a second date to his show in Dublin at 3Arena after the first show sold out quickly. On 26 October 2017, Horan announced the last dates of the tour which included shows in the Philippines, Singapore and Japan.

Critical reception

The Flicker World Tour has received a fair amount of positive reviews from critics. Stacey Mullen of the Evening Times wrote about Horan's potential for a lasting career and talked about how his sound as a solo artist was different from the music made by his former band One Direction. She wrote: "While music fans expected a similar sound to the manufactured pop the band was renown for, Niall Horan went in his own direction and put on a show at the SEC’s Clyde Armadillo on Sunday night which proved he is a true artist whose early catalogue shows promise of longevity." For a review of Horan's concert at the Spark Arena, Rose Riddell of Coup De Main Magazine noted that Horan looked to be at home on stage and that he was "made for touring". She continued on to say: "After his first cover of the night - a folksy rendition of Bruce Springsteen's "Dancing in the Dark", Horan brought out opening act Maren Morris to perform their duet "Seeing Blind", where their voices together live sounded just as good as on the record. An acoustic rendition of "Fool's Gold" saw the audience in awe of Horan, and "Fire Away" was an absolute set highlight - highlighting the total togetherness and musicianship of the live band."
 
In a review for The Independent, Roisin O'Connor stated, "Outside of that first solo, though, he’s an adept – and clearly improving – songwriter who seemed to require fewer co-writes than most major pop artists: his album’s title track is sensitive and endearingly romantic," giving the show in London 4 out of 5 stars. Matilda Elgood for Beat Magazine wrote, "Horan started the show gently, with "On the Loose", swiftly moving into crowd favourite "This Town". Horan has confidently distinguished himself away from the classic boy band sound of One Direction. And even though there was widespread doubt about the boys forging their own careers, Horan has successfully paved the way with his country flare." In his review for the show at the Brisbane Entertainment Centre, Matt Oberhardt of The Courier-Mail touched on Horan's showmanship and musicianship: "He played guitar for most of the concert and showed his musical versatility by even jumping on the piano for "So Long" (a previously unreleased song he has reworked for the tour)." Oberhardt added, "Fans had to wait until the encore for his biggest hit, but they were treated to a polished performance before that showcasing Horan’s strong vocals and clear stage presence."

Setlist 
The following set list was obtained from the concert held on 18 July 2018 in Woodlands, Texas. It does not represent all concerts for the duration of the tour, but is a representation of the latest North America leg.

"On the Loose"  
"The Tide"
"This Town"
"Paper Houses"
"You and Me"
"Dancing in the Dark" 
"Seeing Blind" 
"Flicker"
"Fool's Gold" 
"Too Much to Ask" 
"So Long"
"Since We're Alone"
"Fire Away"
"Finally Free"
"On My Own"
Encore
"Drag Me Down" 
"Slow Hands"
"Mirrors"

Notes
 During the first show in Dublin, a cover of Thin Lizzy's "Dancing in the Moonlight (It's Caught Me in Its Spotlight)" was performed.
 During the second show in Dublin, a cover of U2's "Where the Streets Have No Name" was performed.
 During the show in Bristow, a cover of Tom Petty's "I Won't Back Down" was performed.
 Prior to the Oceania leg, "Mirrors" and "On My Own" were switched.
 Prior to the North American leg, a cover of Camila Cabello's "Crying in the Club" was in the place of "Finally Free".
 Horan performed Billy Joel's "New York State of Mind" at the Wantagh, New York show.
 For the last 6 shows of the North American leg, Horan sang Eagles' "Life in the Fast Lane"

Tour dates

Notes

The score data is representative of the two shows at 3arena on 12, 29 March respectively.

Cancelled shows

References 

2018 concert tours